The 2019 European Parliament election was the United Kingdom's component of the 2019 European Parliament election, held on Thursday 23 May 2019 and the results were announced on Sunday 26 and Monday 27 May 2019, after all the other EU countries had voted. This was the United Kingdom's final participation in a European Parliament election before leaving the European Union on 31 January 2020, and was also the last election to be held under the provisions of the European Parliamentary Elections Act 2002 before its repeal under the European Union (Withdrawal) Act 2018.

Initially no election was planned in the United Kingdom, as Brexit (following the 2016 referendum) was set for 29 March 2019. However, at the European summit on 11 April 2019 the British government and the European Council agreed to delay British withdrawal until 31 October 2019. From then on it was the default position in UK and EU law for the election to take place; however, the UK Government continued making attempts to avoid participation by agreeing on withdrawal before 23 May. On 7 May 2019, the UK government conceded that the election would go ahead.

The election was the ninth time the United Kingdom had elected MEPs to the European Parliament (and the fourth for Gibraltar). Candidate nominations were submitted by 16:00 on 25 April 2019, and voter registration was completed on 7 May 2019. The MEPs sat until 31 January 2020.

Brexit was the central issue of the election campaign; arguments were made that it was a proxy for a second Brexit referendum. The election was won by the Brexit Party who won the most votes and became the largest single national party in the European Parliament, being the dominant choice of those who had voted to leave the European Union. The votes of those who had voted to remain were more fragmented: the Liberal Democrats made substantial gains, finishing second nationally, while the Green Party of England and Wales and Scottish National Party also improved on their 2014 results; however, Change UK failed to win any seats. Compared to the 2014 result, the Labour Party suffered heavy losses, while the Conservative Party lost all but four of its MEPs. The previously dominant UK Independence Party failed to elect any MEPs.

In Northern Ireland, the Republican pro-Remain Sinn Féin and the Unionist pro-Leave Democratic Unionist Party both held their seats, while the Ulster Unionist Party lost its seat to the pro-Remain non-sectarian Alliance Party. In Scotland, the Scottish National Party elected three MEPs, while Labour lost both its MEPs and failed to win a seat in Scotland at a European election for the first time in its history. In Wales, the Brexit Party became the largest party, while the nationalist, pro-Remain Plaid Cymru came second. The Liberal Democrats became the largest party in London.

The election was the first national poll in the United Kingdom since December 1910 in which a successor party to the Liberal Party reached higher than third place in the number of votes or seats, and the first ever national election in which the Conservative Party received less than 10% of the votes cast.

Voting eligibility 
To vote in the election, individuals had to be:
on the Electoral Register;
aged 18 or over on election day;
a British, Irish, Commonwealth or European Union citizen;
resident at an address in the UK, or a British citizen living abroad who has been registered to vote in the UK in the 15 years before the election; and
not legally excluded from voting (for example, a convicted person detained in prison or a mental hospital, or unlawfully at large if they would otherwise have been detained, or a person found guilty of certain corrupt or illegal practices)

Individuals had to be registered to vote by midnight on 7 May 2019. A person with two homes, such as a university student with a term-time address but living at home during holidays, could be registered to vote at both addresses as long as they are not in the same electoral area, but could vote in only one constituency at the election.

European Union citizens (except for British, Irish, Cypriot and Maltese citizens) also had to submit a European Parliament voter registration form (also known as Form UC1 or Form EC6) by midnight on 7 May 2019 to confirm that they would vote in the European Parliament election only in the UK, and not in their home country. However, in the top 10 local authorities with EU citizens, only 21% of EU citizens who were on the Electoral Register returned this form by the deadline. EU citizens who did not submit this form were unable to vote in the election.

Constituencies

The United Kingdom was divided into 12 multi-member constituencies: the nine regions of England, plus Scotland, Wales and Northern Ireland. Gibraltar was assigned to the South West England constituency. As had been the case since 1999, the English electoral constituencies were based on the government's nine English regions. The seat allocation was the same as in 2014.

The breakdown of seats just prior to the election was:

Electoral method

In Great Britain, candidates stood on either a party list, known as a closed list, in a set order of priority decided by that party, or as an independent. Voters chose a party (not an individual party candidate) or an independent candidate. Seats would then be allocated proportionally to the share of votes cast for each party or individual candidate in the electoral region using the D'Hondt method of calculation. The first seat was allocated to the party or individual with the highest number of votes. After each seat was allocated to a party, for the purpose of allocating further seats that party's total votes would then be divided by one plus the number of seats already allocated to that party, to give the party's quotient. The second and subsequent seats were allocated in turn to the party or independent candidate with the greatest quotient.

The Northern Ireland constituency used the single transferable vote (STV) system to allocate its three MEPs. Voters ranked the candidates sequentially, in the order of their choice.

Background

Expected cancellation and contingency planning
The United Kingdom invoked Article 50 of the Treaty on the European Union on 29 March 2017 following a referendum on 23 June 2016 to leave the European Union. As a result, the country was due to leave the EU on 29 March 2019, before the European Parliament elections took place. Nonetheless, on 27 May 2018, it was reported that the UK's Electoral Commission had set aside £829,000 for its "activities relating to a European Parliamentary election in 2019". The Commission described the money as a "precautionary measure, so that we have the necessary funds to deliver our functions at a European Parliamentary election, in the unlikely event that they do go ahead".

The European Parliament resolution of 7 February 2018 on the composition of the European Parliament (2017/2054(INL) – 2017/0900(NLE)) included these clauses:
 H7 refers to the re-allocation of some UK seats following the UK withdrawal from the EU, stating: "Underlines that the seats to be vacated by the United Kingdom upon its withdrawal from the European Union will facilitate the adoption of a new allocation of seats in Parliament, which will implement the principle of degressive proportionality; further underlines that the new allocation proposed would allow for a reduction in the size of Parliament; notes that the use of only a fraction of the seats vacated by the United Kingdom is sufficient to ensure no loss of seats for any Member State".
 H6 has a contingency for the situation that the UK does not leave the EU before the 2019 election, stating that "in case the above mentioned legal situation concerning the United Kingdom’s withdrawal from the European Union changes, the allocation of seats applied during the 2014–2019 parliamentary term should apply until the withdrawal of the United Kingdom from the European Union becomes legally effective".

The European Council also drew up contingency plans allowing the UK to retain its MEPs were Brexit to be postponed:
However, in the event that the United Kingdom is still a Member State of the Union at the beginning of the 2019–2024 parliamentary term, the number of representatives in the European Parliament per Member State taking up office shall be the one provided for in Article 3 of the European Council Decision 2013/312/EU until the withdrawal of the United Kingdom from the Union becomes legally effective.

Official preparations
After Brexit was delayed beyond its initial planned date of 29 March 2019, the possibility of a sufficiently long delay so as to require the election to take place became more apparent. The period for withdrawal under Article 50 was first extended, with the unanimous approval of the European Council, until 12 April 2019 – the deadline for informing the EU of the intention to hold an election. By early April, the House of Commons had voted again to extend the withdrawal period, and a deadline of 31 October 2019 was agreed between the UK and the Council. The UK Government therefore ordered preparations for the election, with the deadline for candidate nominations on 24 April for the South West England region and 25 April for all other regions.

Nevertheless, ratification of a withdrawal agreement by the UK and European parliaments would still have permitted the UK to leave before October. Had this occurred before 23 May, the United Kingdom and Gibraltar would not have taken part in the 2019 European Parliament elections scheduled for that day. On 7 May, the UK Government announced that it would not be able to obtain ratification in time to prevent the elections, although it still aimed to ratify the withdrawal agreement before October. Later in May, it also acknowledged that the MEPs elected would take up their seats, with Brexit not due to happen until after 2 July.

Campaign background
The two major UK political parties, the Conservatives and Labour, saw the prospect of elections for the European Parliament (while the UK was due to leave the European Union) as problematic, with both having been keen to avoid this scenario. The backdrop of ongoing debate around Brexit was expected to be a very significant factor in how people voted, with the election seen by many as a "proxy referendum" on whether the country should leave the EU or not. Commentators suggested that the vote share for the Conservatives and Labour could fall, with voters moving towards a number of pro-Leave or pro-Remain parties, and this did indeed happen.

The Conservative government had made several attempts to get the Withdrawal Agreement that it had negotiated with the EU approved by the House of Commons, which would have allowed for Brexit before the election. All these having failed, the Conservatives entered into cross-party talks with the Labour Party to see whether they could agree a withdrawal plan. These talks were still ongoing as of 10 May 2019, but eventually failed.

The election was seen as being significant for two new single-issue parties: the Brexit Party (supporting Brexit), and Change UK (supporting the UK remaining in the EU).

Between the 2014 and 2019 elections, there were many changes to the breakdown of UK members due to defections and changes in affiliation. This table shows the number of MEPs in each party at both ends of the term:

Candidates

Nomination papers had to be submitted by 16:00 on the 19th working day before election day (25 April 2019). To stand as a candidate, individuals had to be aged 18 or over on the date of nomination and a British or European Union citizen, or a Commonwealth citizen possessing indefinite leave to remain or not requiring leave to enter or remain in the UK.

In April 2019, Labour said it had started its process for choosing candidates. 16 out of the 20 MEPs elected last time applied to stand again. The party's candidates were announced on 18 April, and included former Cabinet minister Andrew Adonis, former MP Katy Clark and the national co-ordinator of campaigning group Momentum Laura Parker.

Following the prospect of a delay to Brexit, Conservative Party MEPs were asked by their delegation leader if they would consider standing again if there were a delay that would mean the UK staying in the EU beyond the date of the next European Parliament election. Fifteen of the party's 18 MEPs stood again as lead candidates for their respective regions.

The Brexit Party ran candidates for all 70 seats in Great Britain, with leader Nigel Farage, himself a former UKIP leader, standing in the South East England region, and former Conservative candidate Annunziata Rees-Mogg standing in the East Midlands region. Writer Claire Fox, formerly of the Revolutionary Communist Party, and former Conservative MP Ann Widdecombe both also stood.

The UK Independence Party selected its three remaining MEPs as candidates, along with social media activist Carl Benjamin and YouTuber Mark Meechan.

The Green Party of England and Wales and the corresponding party in Scotland, the Scottish Greens, began their candidate selection processes in March. The Green Party of England and Wales announced a full slate of candidates for England and Wales on 24 April 2019, including one of its three outgoing MEPs, Molly Scott Cato. Other candidates included Catherine Rowett, Rupert Read and former Lord Mayor of Sheffield, Magid Magid.

The Liberal Democrats announced their selected candidates for England and Wales on 17 April 2019 following a membership vote. The party's sole incumbent MEP, Catherine Bearder, was re-selected as its lead candidate for South East England, while former MEPs Chris Davies, Fiona Hall, Bill Newton Dunn and Phil Bennion were selected as lead candidates for their respective regions. Other candidates included in London the entrepreneur Dinesh Dhamija and the former leader of the People's Alliance of Tower Hamlets, Rabina Khan, and former MPs Martin Horwood and Stephen Williams in the South West. The party also stood a full slate in Scotland.

Change UK said it had had 3,700 applicants to be candidates, including former MPs from both the Labour Party and the Conservative Party. Their candidates included writer Rachel Johnson (sister of Conservative MP Boris Johnson and formerly of the Liberal Democrats), former BBC journalist Gavin Esler, former Conservative MPs Stephen Dorrell and Neil Carmichael, former Labour MEP Carole Tongue, former Labour MPs Roger Casale and Jon Owen Jones, former Liberal Democrat MEP Diana Wallis, and former deputy Prime Minister of Poland Jacek Rostowski. It stood 70 candidates (all of Great Britain, but not Northern Ireland). Two of its candidates subsequently withdrew from the ballot due to reports that they had made misogynistic and racist remarks.

Jill Evans, Plaid Cymru's sole MEP, stood as the party's lead candidate as part of a full slate for the Wales constituency.

The Women's Equality Party stood in the London constituency, with the party's co-founder Catherine Mayer as the lead candidate.

Far-right activist Tommy Robinson stood as an independent for the North West England constituency.

Further parties and independent candidates also stood, including the English Democrats and the Yorkshire Party.

Nine candidates, seven in London and two in South West England, were part of the new Climate Emergency Independents group. They took part in and were inspired by the Extinction Rebellion protests. However, as they were not a registered political party, they were all listed as separate independents on the ballot paper.

Patrick O'Flynn, the Social Democratic Party's sole MEP, who defected to the SDP after originally being elected for UKIP, stated in April 2019 that the party would not be standing candidates at the election.

Northern Ireland

Northern Ireland has a different party system to Great Britain, dominated by regional parties, and using single transferable vote rather than the party list system.

Two of the three sitting MEPs contested the election: Martina Anderson for Sinn Féin and Diane Dodds for the Democratic Unionist Party. Jim Nicholson, who had represented the Ulster Unionist Party since 1989, retired, with Danny Kennedy instead running for the party.

Three parties selected their leaders as candidates: Colum Eastwood for the SDLP, Naomi Long for the Alliance Party, and Clare Bailey for the Green Party.

UKIP nominated Robert Hill as their candidate. The Conservative Party also nominated a candidate, making the Conservatives and UKIP the only two parties to stand candidates in all regions across the UK.

In April 2019, Jane Morrice, co-founder of the Northern Ireland Women's Coalition and a former deputy speaker of the Northern Ireland Assembly, announced she was standing as an independent on a pro-Remain platform.

Parties in the election

Campaign

Labour
In early 2019 there was an ongoing debate within Labour as to what its policy should be with respect to Brexit. On 20 April, the party's deputy leader Tom Watson argued the party needed to back a second referendum on Brexit in order to present a clear alternative to and beat the Brexit Party, but that was not Labour's preferred option. A draft of a Labour leaflet that made no reference to a second referendum provoked a public row, including more than 90 Labour MPs and MEPs writing to the party's National Executive Committee (NEC) in protest. On 27 April, Labour announced that the original leaflet draft was to be redrafted to include details of the party's preparations for a general election, with a referendum if necessary to avoid what it called a "bad Tory deal".

Labour's manifesto for the elections was agreed at an NEC meeting on 30 April, re-affirming its 2018 policy that it will first seek a Brexit deal on its terms (including a Customs Union), but if that is not possible, it will seek a general election, and, if that is not possible, a second referendum. Only one vote was held at the meeting, on an amendment from the TSSA union that sought to commit Labour to a referendum on any Brexit deal, but this was rejected by a what NEC sources called a "clear" margin. Retiring Labour MEP Mary Honeyball criticised this as "Not good enough" and some Labour Party members destroyed their membership cards in protest. However, some Remain-supporting Labour MPs, and Labour MPs sceptical of a second referendum, welcomed the decision. Watson had walked out of the Shadow Cabinet meeting earlier on 30 April in protest at Shadow Cabinet members not being shown the draft manifesto.

Labour's 9 May campaign launch stressed bringing the country together. Jeremy Corbyn talked of a "healing process" between those who supported Leave and Remain. By mid-May, Watson and Labour's Shadow Brexit Secretary Keir Starmer were arguing for a second referendum, yet their shadow international trade secretary Barry Gardiner stated "Labour is not a Remain party now". In most voting areas, e.g. Scotland and South West England, all Labour candidates stated their support for a second referendum, with the UK's longest-serving MEP, David Martin (Labour) and the Labour Leader in the European Parliament Richard Corbett MEP among those calling for the country to stay in the EU. Polling in mid-May suggested both Labour supporters and the electorate in general were split as to whether Labour supported remaining or leaving the EU.

Conservative
The Conservative government was hopeful of agreeing a withdrawal deal with the EU soon enough that UK MEPs would not take up their seats. The party did not spend any central money on candidate campaigning, did not publish a manifesto and did not hold a campaign launch. One Conservative MEP said that the deficit of campaigning would be used as an excuse if the party does poorly in the elections. Many party activists were demotivated given the failure of the government to deliver Brexit. Conservative councillors in Derbyshire boycotted the European elections and refused to campaign in protest. A survey of 781 Conservative councillors found that 40% plan to vote for the Brexit Party. Conservative MPs, including Lucy Allan, tweeted positive comments about the Brexit Party. In response, the Conservative Party issued a warning that individuals campaigning for or endorsing other parties will be expelled from the party.

The Prime Minister and leader of the Conservative Party, Theresa May, had announced her intention to resign before the next general election, but further pressure mounted on her to be clear about her timetable for departure, with May meeting the party's 1922 Committee on the matter on 16 May 2019. This resulted in May agreeing to stand down by 30 June 2019. Campaigning by possible successors accelerated after the local elections.

UKIP 
UKIP argued it was "the authentic party of Brexit, the true party of Leave", to quote party leader Gerard Batten. Alongside the Conservatives, UKIP was one of two Brexit-supporting parties fielding a candidate in every region of the United Kingdom, including Northern Ireland. Batten criticised the rival Brexit Party as having no policies. UKIP launched its campaign on 18 April. There was renewed criticism surrounding its candidate Carl Benjamin for telling Labour MP Jess Phillips "I wouldn't even rape you" on Twitter in 2016, and producing a satirical video. Further controversy came as one of UKIP's sitting MEPs Stuart Agnew addressed a pro-apartheid club of expat South Africans in London that reportedly had links to the far-right.

Brexit Party 
Nigel Farage, the Brexit Party and former UKIP leader, said that there was "no difference between the Brexit party and UKIP in terms of policy, [but] in terms of personnel, there's a vast difference", criticising UKIP's connections to the far right. On 15 April 2019, three more sitting female UKIP MEPs defected to the Brexit Party, criticising UKIP's nomination of Benjamin as a candidate. In particular, Collins noted UKIP leader Gerard Batten's defence of Benjamin's "use of a non-rape threat as 'satire'" to be an especially compelling factor. Two further UKIP MEPs moved to the Brexit Party on 17 April. On 23 April, Farage said that the Brexit Party was not "here just to get a process vote on 23 May – far from it, 23 May for us is just the beginning". He also argued that the better the performance of the Brexit Party, the lower the chance of a second referendum on Brexit. Farage argued that should the Brexit Party get most votes in the elections, his party should get a seat at the UK/EU negotiations.

Liberal Democrats, Green Party and Change UK
The three main nationwide pro-European Union parties standing in the election, Liberal Democrats, Greens and Change UK, wished to treat the election as a "soft referendum" on Europe. Commentators such as Marina Hyde raised the concern of a split vote among pro-Remain parties reducing the number of pro-Remain MEPs being elected. Vince Cable, the leader of the Liberal Democrats, proposed standing joint candidates with the Greens and Change UK on a common policy of seeking a second referendum on Brexit, but the other parties rejected the idea. Change UK's co-founder Chuka Umunna confirmed the Lib Dem approach, but he and Change UK interim leader Heidi Allen dismissed concerns of a split Remain vote. Independent MEP Julie Girling, then supporting Change UK, said she had decided not to stand for re-election as a Change UK candidate because of the concern about maximising the Remain vote. On 10 May, she endorsed the Liberal Democrats. Change UK and Girling clarified that she had not been and was not a Change UK MEP, with Girling saying she sat as an independent MEP. On 15 May, David Macdonald, the lead candidate for Change UK in Scotland, switched to endorsing the Liberal Democrats in order not to split the pro-Remain vote. On 22 May, Allen said that she and another Change UK MP, Sarah Wollaston, wanted to advise Remain supporters to vote Liberal Democrat outside of London and South East England, but they were overruled by other party members.

The Greens said that joint lists were not "desirable" and that there were "fundamental ideological differences" on other issues between the parties that wanted a second referendum. The Green Party campaigned on a platform calling for action on climate change as well as an anti-Brexit platform.

The Liberal Democrats ran on a "stop Brexit" message, seeking the support of those who wanted the UK to remain in the EU. At his party's campaign launch on 26 April, Cable lamented that it was not standing on a common platform with other parties opposed to Brexit. It launched its manifesto on 9 May, unveiling its campaign slogan "Bollocks to Brexit," which attracted considerable media debate. Polling in the final fortnight put the Liberal Democrats ahead of the other pro-Remain parties and overtaking Labour in some polls.

Change UK (which in early April was still known as the Independent Group) saw the election as an important launchpad for its new party, seeking to turn the ballot into a "proxy referendum" on Brexit. On 16 April 2019, two former Conservative MEPs, who had left the party to sit as independents within the European People's Party grouping, announced their support for Change UK. The Renew Party agreed to support Change UK at the elections, and the latter included candidates from Renew's approved list. Molly Scott Cato, a sitting MEP for the Green Party of England and Wales, criticised Change UK as "a single-issue party with no coherent policy platform beyond opposing Brexit".

Other parties
The SNP campaign launch was marred by tens of thousands of personalised letters being sent to the wrong people. The mistake was reported to be in the data supplied by SNP HQ, run by Peter Murrell, husband of SNP leader Nicola Sturgeon. The party apologised for the error: the party referred itself to the Information Commissioner's Office and may be fined.

The DUP campaigned on sending a message to "get on with Brexit".

Later events
Local elections were held in most of England and all of Northern Ireland on 2 May. The results saw both Conservatives and Labour losing seats in what The Guardian called a "Brexit backlash" while the Liberal Democrats, Greens and independents made gains. The Liberal Democrats made the biggest gains which the Lib Dem leader Vince Cable put down to a rejection of the Conservatives and Labour over their Brexit approaches. Stephen Bush, writing in the New Statesman, argued that the Lib Dem success in the local elections make it the most likely party for Remain voters to rally around at the European elections while James Moore in The Independent described them as having the "momentum" leading into the European elections. Alliance (the Lib Dems' sister party in Northern Ireland), other smaller parties and independents also made significant gains in the local elections in Northern Ireland.

On 18 May, former Conservative Deputy Prime Minister and sitting Conservative peer Michael Heseltine said he would vote for the Liberal Democrats instead of the Conservatives because of his own party's support for Brexit. Heseltine subsequently had the Conservative whip suspended, owing to his comments.

Polling after the local elections saw the Brexit Party in front, followed by Labour, with the Liberal Democrats taking third from the Conservatives. Conservative sources predicted the party could come even lower than fourth. By the weekend before the vote, the Labour Party was concerned at the increased polling for the Liberal Democrats, which came above Labour in London and in some national polls.

On 17 May, Labour left talks that had been held to find a Brexit deal with the Conservative government. May then proposed to bring a new deal to the House of Commons for a vote in early June, which she described as an "improved package of measures", after which she was expected to step down as Prime Minister and leader of the Conservative Party.

The campaign saw multiple cases of milkshakes being thrown at controversial MEP candidates on the right. The protests began against Carl Benjamin, the anti-feminist social media activist who had attracted controversy for jokes about rape, and activist Tommy Robinson. They later extended to Nigel Farage, leader of the Brexit Party. Police asked a Scottish fast food outlet near where a Farage rally was taking place not to sell milkshakes on the night of the event.

On 21 May, the Prime Minister and Leader of the Conservative Party, Theresa May made a speech outlining her plan to introduce an EU withdrawal agreement bill in June that would allow the Commons to make amendments, e.g. in favour of a Customs Union or a second referendum, but this was received badly by much of her own party as well as by other parties. There were growing calls for her to resign on 22 May, the day before the election. Andrea Leadsom, the Leader of the House of Commons, resigned on the evening of 22 May. May had planned to publish the bill on Friday 24 May, but on polling day, she abandoned that plan, with publication delayed until early June. On the day after the vote, May announced that she would resign as party leader on 7 June.

There were several reports on the day of problems encountered by non-UK UK-resident EU citizens not being able to vote because their paperwork had not been processed in time, with opposition politicians raising concerns as to whether there had been systemic failures. At least three councils admitted that the compressed timescale of the election meant that they had not been able to send postal ballots out in time for some voters overseas. A report by The Guardian after the election found that there were low levels of completion of UC1 forms, required by UK-resident EU citizens in order for them to vote in the UK, in many parts of the country. After the election, the European Commission complained to the UK government about the "obstacles" faced by EU citizens in voting. A month later, the Dutch Interior Ministry stated that almost half the local UK registration officials had failed to send the UC1 data to the Dutch authorities, and that a portion of the data sent was unusable, despite complaints by the Dutch government about similar issues in 2014.

Between the vote and the count
Because results could not be announced until the last European Union member country's polls had closed, and most countries in the EU voted on Sunday, the counting of UK ballots started on Sunday 26 May 2019.

Within a day of the polls closing, two party leaders and one deputy party leader announced their plans to resign. On 24 May, Theresa May announced her plan to resign as leader of the Conservative Party on 7 June, which would trigger a leadership contest. On the same day, Mike Hookem resigned as deputy leader of UKIP in order to challenge for the leadership. Vince Cable, leader of the Liberal Democrats, had previously stated his intention to stand down after the local elections and European Parliament elections. The party's leadership contest officially started on 24 May.

Two Labour politicians announced their departures from the party after the vote: departing MEP Mary Honeyball and former Welsh AM Leighton Andrews; Andrews said he had voted Green. Both criticised Labour over alleged antisemitism and their failure to oppose Brexit. Alastair Campbell, formerly Director of Communications for the Labour Party, said he had voted for a pro-Remain party, the first time in his life he had not voted Labour. He later revealed that he voted for the Liberal Democrats and was expelled from the Labour Party.

Party Brexit positions

Among other parties, the SDLP opposed Brexit and supported a second referendum, but it supported the withdrawal agreement if Brexit is to take place. The Alliance Party opposed Brexit, while TUV supported it.

Debates
A livestreamed debate was held by The Daily Telegraph between Nigel Farage, leader of the Brexit Party, and Vince Cable, leader of the Liberal Democrats.

A debate was held by the BBC in Northern Ireland, with candidates of the main regional parties represented. The BBC also held a debate between the lead candidates of all parties standing in Wales.

Endorsements

Newspapers

Opinion polls

The chart below depicts opinion polls conducted in Great Britain for the 2019 European Parliament elections in the UK; trendlines are local regressions (LOESS). There was regular polling from mid-March. The share for the Brexit Party rose rapidly, and it led the polls from late April. The share for the Labour Party declined over the period, but they came second in most polls. Polling for the Liberal Democrats started rising towards the end of April, with most polls predicting they would come third. Polling for the Conservative Party fell over the period, with most polls predicting it would come fourth.

Results

Results were declared for Wales and most of England on Sunday evening, with results for the rest of England and for Scotland coming on Monday. Results for Northern Ireland were clear by the end of Monday.

Results by constituency and local areas

Vote share by constituency (GB only)

Analysis

The Brexit Party was the largest party, gaining five more seats than UKIP achieved in 2014. Nigel Farage, as leader of UKIP in 2014 and the Brexit Party in 2019, became the first person to lead two different parties that topped a national election. The Brexit party came first in Wales and in eight of the nine English constituencies. It finished third in London. The Brexit Party polled highest in regions that voted Leave in the Brexit referendum.

The Liberal Democrats came second. This was its best performance in a national election since the 2010 general election and its best ever in a European Parliament election. This was the first time it or its predecessor parties had come second in a national election since before the Second World War. It was the largest party in the London constituency, the largest party in the second-highest number of English reporting areas, and the only party other than the SNP to top any Scottish reporting area.

The Labour Party was third overall. It did not come first in any constituency. This was its worst result in Wales for nearly a century; it did not come first in any reporting area in Wales or Scotland. Labour's vote fell in both Remain and Leave areas.

The Greens came fourth, with their best performance since the 1989 European elections. The Green Party of England and Wales was the largest party in three reporting areas.

The Conservative Party came fifth, and was not the largest party in any reporting area, polling below 10% for the first time in the party's history. It lost votes across the country, but did worst in Remain areas. The combined share for Labour and the Conservatives was 23%, well below their previous (post-Second World War) low of 43.5% in 2009.

The SNP came sixth overall but first in the single Scottish constituency, the only one in which it stood candidates. It was the largest party in 30 of the 32 Scottish council areas.

Plaid Cymru came second in Wales behind the Brexit Party, marking the first time it had beaten Labour in any Wales-wide election. The closest result across the UK was in Wales, where the Liberal Democrats were 13,948 votes (1.7%) behind Labour for the last MEP.

In Northern Ireland, the three MEPs elected were from the Democratic Unionist Party, which advocates the continuation of the union with Great Britain, Sinn Féin, which campaigns for a united Ireland, and the cross-community Alliance Party. The latter two were opposed to Brexit. It was the first time that unionists had won fewer than two of the three seats, and the first time that all three MEPs were women. The Alliance success was noted as an indicator for the rise of the "Others", who identify neither as Unionist nor Nationalist.

Various analyses sought to combine vote shares for different parties together to index a pro-Remain or pro-Leave vote. A Press Association report aggregated support for explicitly anti-Brexit parties, defined as the LibDems, Greens, SNP, Plaid Cymru and Change UK, totalling 40.4%, versus that for those supporting a no-deal Brexit, the Brexit Party and UKIP, on 34.9% (figures are for Great Britain only, excluding Northern Ireland where there was a majority for anti-Brexit parties). That analysis excludes Labour on 14% and the Conservatives on 9%. Guardian journalist Dan Sabbagh noted how there were several possible comparisons one could make, e.g. the Brexit Party (5.2 million votes) against the Liberal Democrats and Greens combined (5.4 million votes); or the Brexit Party, UKIP and the DUP (5.9 million votes) against the Liberal Democrats, Greens, Change UK, SNP, Plaid Cymru, Sinn Féin and Alliance (6.8 million votes). In terms of seats, 34 were won by Leave-supporting parties and 39 by Remain-supporting parties (if Conservatives are counted for 'Leave'). Sabbagh, later followed by fellow Guardian journalist Polly Toynbee, tackled how to account for Labour and Conservative votes by adding them in based on polling as to how their supporters split—assigning 80% of Conservative voters to Leave and 60% of Labour voters to remain—in this way predicting a 50%-Remain-to-47%-Leave split in a second referendum. However, BBC political journalist Laura Kuenssberg critiqued the whole endeavour of adding up different vote shares. In terms of a comparison between Leave- and Remain-supporting parties, psephologist John Curtice simply described the result as a draw.

A large post-vote poll commissioned by Michael Ashcroft estimated that 53% of those who voted Conservative in the 2017 general election voted for the Brexit Party, while 21% voted Conservative and 12% voted Liberal Democrat. 38% of those who voted Labour in 2017 supported the party at this election, while 22% voted Liberal Democrat, 17% Green and 13% Brexit Party. 69% of the LibDem voters of 2017 stayed with the party, while 13% voted Green and 7% Brexit Party. 24% of the UKIP voters of 2017 stayed with their party, but 68% switched to the Brexit Party. Among all voters, 50% said they had voted to remain in the referendum and 45% to leave; and 50% stated they now wanted to leave, and 46% stated they now wanted to remain.

YouGov released polling suggesting 41% of Labour Party members voted for other parties at the European election (including 19% Green and 15% Liberal Democrat). Likewise, 67% of Conservative Party members voted for other parties (59% Brexit Party).

Electoral Commission report
The Electoral Commission released its report on the election on 8 October 2019. The report highlighted the difficulties for EU27 citizens and British citizens abroad to vote, despite concerns raised after the 2014 European election.

Reaction to results
The results were expected to push the Conservative Party towards a more hardline position with respect to Brexit and to lean towards electing a Brexiter in its leadership contest shortly afterward.

Reacting to the results, the Shadow Foreign Secretary Emily Thornberry and Deputy Leader Tom Watson called for the Labour Party to change its policy to supporting a second referendum and remaining in the EU. There was renewed debate within the Labour Party over its policy, with a shift towards clearer support for a second referendum, including Jeremy Corbyn stating that although a general election would be Labour's preference, any Brexit deal "had to be put to a public vote", but there was continuing criticism over the party's clarity on and Corbyn's commitment to another referendum. A modified policy was announced in July. Meanwhile, Leave supporters in the party were critical of any support for a second referendum.

Alastair Campbell, having revealed he voted for the Liberal Democrats, was expelled from the Labour Party, but this decision was criticised by some in the party. In response, former Labour Home Secretary Charles Clarke and former Labour MP (until 2017) Fiona Mactaggart announced that they had also voted Liberal Democrat, while former Labour Cabinet member Bob Ainsworth announced he had voted Green. A hashtag on Twitter in support, #expelmetoo, proved popular on social media. Watson and Harriet Harman criticised the expulsion. Labour MP Owen Smith, among others, noted the juxtaposition of Campbell's expulsion on the same day that the EHRC opened an enquiry into anti-Semitism in Labour and the slow response to complaints of anti-Semitism. It then emerged that Cherie Blair, wife of the former Labour Prime Minister Tony Blair, had also voted Liberal Democrat. YouGov polling suggested 41% of Labour Party members voted for other parties (including 19% Green and 15% Liberal Democrat) at the election.

General election polling shortly after the European elections showed continued support for the Brexit Party and the Liberal Democrats. A YouGov poll conducted on 28–29 May put the Liberal Democrats first and the Brexit Party second, with Labour and the Conservatives third. This was the first time a national poll had ever found that neither of the most popular two parties were Labour or the Conservatives.

On 4 June 2019, in response to their poor performance in the elections, six of the eleven MPs in Change UK left the group to return to sitting as independents. The party's former spokesperson, Chuka Umunna, announced on 13 June that he would be seeking to join the Liberal Democrats.

MEPs not returning

MEPs not standing for re-election
Twenty-eight MEPs sitting at the end of the European Parliament's term did not seek re-election.

Brexit Party
All originally elected as UKIP:
 Tim Aker – East of England
 Jonathan Arnott – North East England
 David Coburn – Scotland
 Jane Collins – Yorkshire and the Humber
 Bill Etheridge – West Midlands
 Ray Finch – South East England
 Diane James – South East England
 Paul Nuttall – North West England
 Margot Parker – East Midlands
 Julia Reid – South West England
 Jill Seymour – West Midlands

Conservative
 David Campbell Bannerman – East of England
 Jacqueline Foster – North West England
 Kay Swinburne – Wales

Greens
 Jean Lambert – London
 Keith Taylor – South East England

Labour
 Lucy Anderson – London
 Mary Honeyball – London
 Derek Vaughan – Wales
Two additional Labour MEPs had already resigned ahead of the election, with their seats remaining vacant for the rest of the Parliament:
 Linda McAvan – Yorkshire and the Humber (resigned 18 April 2019)
 Catherine Stihler – Scotland (resigned 31 January 2019)

Independents elected as UKIP
 Janice Atkinson – South East England
 Louise Bours – North West England
 James Carver – West Midlands
 William Legge, Earl of Dartmouth – South West England
 Steven Woolfe – North West England

Other
 Julie Girling, independent MEP for South West England; originally elected as Conservative
 Patrick O'Flynn, SDP MEP for East of England; originally elected as UKIP
 Ian Hudghton, SNP MEP for Scotland
 Jim Nicholson, Ulster Unionist MEP for Northern Ireland

Incumbent MEPs defeated

Change UK
Richard Ashworth – South East England (originally elected as Conservative)

Conservative
Amjad Bashir – Yorkshire and the Humber (originally elected as UK Independence Party)
Daniel Dalton – West Midlands
Nirj Deva – South East England
John Flack – East of England
Ashley Fox (Conservative Group leader in the European Parliament) – South West England
Syed Kamall (co-chair of the ECR group) – London
Sajjad Karim – North West England
Rupert Matthews – East Midlands
Emma McClarkin – East Midlands
John Procter – Yorkshire and the Humber
Charles Tannock – London

Labour
Paul Brannen – North East England
Wajid Khan – North West England
David Martin – Scotland
Alex Mayer – East of England
Clare Moody – South West England
Siôn Simon – West Midlands

UK Independence Party
Stuart Agnew – East of England
Gerard Batten (UKIP leader) – London
Mike Hookem – Yorkshire and the Humber

See also 
Opinion polling on the United Kingdom's membership of the European Union (2016–2020)
2019 European Parliament election in Gibraltar
2019 United Kingdom general election

Footnotes

References

External links 

 House of Commons Briefings: 2019 UK European Parliament Election Results
European Parliament – Liaison Office in the United Kingdom
The Electoral Commission – European Parliamentary elections

Manifestos
 Alliance
 Change UK
 DUP
 Green Party of England and Wales
 Labour
 Liberal Democrats
 Plaid Cymru
 Sinn Féin
 Scottish Greens
 UKIP

European Parliament
United Kingdom
European Parliament elections in the United Kingdom
May 2019 events in the United Kingdom